Fontaine-l'Évêque is a city and municipality of Wallonia located in the province of Hainaut, Belgium. 

On January 1, 2006, Fontaine-l'Évêque had a total population of 16,687. The total area is 28.41 km² which gives a population density of 587 inhabitants per km².

The municipality consists of the following districts: Fontaine-l'Évêque, Forchies-la-Marche, and Leernes.

References

External links
 

Cities in Wallonia
Municipalities of Hainaut (province)